Anthony LaMolinara is an American film director, producer and special effects artist.

Oscar history

LaMolinara has won the Academy Award for Best Visual Effects once, with one other nomination. Both of the following are in this category:

75th Academy Awards - Nominated for Spider-Man. Nomination shared with John Dykstra, John Frazier and Scott Stokdyk. Lost to The Lord of the Rings: The Two Towers.
77th Academy Awards - Spider-Man 2, award shared with John Dykstra, John Frazier and Scott Stokdyk. Won.

References

External links

Living people
Year of birth missing (living people)
Best Visual Effects Academy Award winners
Special effects people
American film directors
American film producers